Jamie Hendry (born 24 July 1985) born in London (England) is a British theater executive, actor, and producer.

Education
Born in London, England, Hendry attended Paul's School (London) prior to graduating from Warwick University in 2006.

Career
Hendry established Hendry Productions in 2008 after working as an assistant producer in the West End and on Broadway. Productions he has worked on include the Olivier Award-winning Legally Blonde: The Musical, Let It Be and La Cage aux Folles (2008 West End revival).

In 2010, he was nominated for The Independent and The Hospital Club 100 most influential people in the creative industries.

In 2011, Hendry announced the development of a new musical adaptation of The Wind in the Willows with book by Julian Fellowes and music and lyrics by George Stiles and Anthony Drewe. This show went on to raise £1 Million via online crowdfunding. The production went on to open at the London Palladium in 2017, and was shown in various theaters around the country.

In 2014 and 2017, Hendry was ranked among the top 100 influential power brokers in the British theatre industry.

In 2019, Hendry launched the New English Shakespeare Company, an international touring company, with a production of Much Ado About Nothing at the Dubai Opera in September 2019.

Hendry is a member of the Society of London Theatre.

Theatre credits

Film credits

Awards
Laurence Olivier Awards
2009 Best Musical Revival La Cage aux Folles (2008 London revival)
2010 Best New Musical – Spring Awakening

2011 Best New Musical – Legally Blonde: The Musical

Critics' Circle Theatre Awards
2008 The Peter Hepple Award for Best Musical – La Cage aux Folles (2008 London revival)
2009 The Peter Hepple Award for Best Musical – Spring Awakening

Whatsonstage Theatregoer's Choice Awards
2009 The Nick Hern's Books Best New Play – Under the Blue Sky

2011 Best New Musical – Legally Blonde: The Musical

References

External links 
Jamie Hendry Productions

Online crowdfunding website for The Wind in the Willows

British theatre managers and producers
Living people
1985 births
People educated at St Paul's School, London